Cold Spring Township is an inactive township in Phelps County, in the U.S. state of Missouri.

Cold Spring Township was erected in 1857, taking its name from the cold springs in the area.

References

Townships in Missouri
Townships in Phelps County, Missouri
1857 establishments in Missouri